The 2015 Duo BRDC Formula 4 Championship was a multi-event motor racing championship for open wheel, formula racing cars held across England. The championship featured a mix of professional motor racing teams and privately funded drivers competing in 2-litre Duratec single seat race cars that conformed to the technical regulations for the championship. The 2015 season was the third BRDC Formula 4 Championship organised by the British Racing Drivers' Club in the United Kingdom. The season began at Oulton Park on 4 April and ended on 27 September at Brands Hatch, after eight triple header events for a total of twenty-four races.

Will Palmer, running for the HHC Motorsport team, was a comfortable champion in the series; he wrapped up the title with one event to spare. Having been a title contender in 2014, Palmer won exactly half of the races to be held in 2015 – a series-record twelve wins – and fifteen podiums in total saw him finish 137 points clear of the championship runner-up, team-mate Harrison Newey. Newey racked up eight podium finishes before he was able to take the first of two victories during the season, at Donington Park. He added a second win at Brands Hatch, taking a total of twelve podium finishes in 2015. Third place in the drivers' championship went to Chris Dittmann Racing driver Tom Jackson, who also won two races during the season – both coming at Snetterton.

Five other drivers won races during the season; Lanan Racing duo Rodrigo Fonseca (Rockingham and Silverstone) and Chris Mealin (Oulton Park and Rockingham) each won a pair of races, as did Jordan Albert of Sean Walkinshaw Racing, winning races at Oulton Park and Brands Hatch. The remaining races were won by Jackson's team-mate Omar Ismail at Snetterton and Michael O'Brien, who won the partially reversed-grid race at Rockingham for MGR Motorsport. Of the 23 drivers eligible to score points towards the drivers' championship, 17 recorded at least one podium finish.

Teams and drivers
All teams were British-registered.

Notes

Race calendar and results
The calendar was published on 26 November 2014. The series supported British GT at six events, with stand-alone events at Snetterton in July and Brands Hatch in September.

Championship standings
Scoring system
Points were awarded to the top 20 classified finishers in all races.

Drivers' championship

Jack Cavill Pole Position Cup
The Jack Cavill Pole Position Cup was awarded to the driver who started from pole position most often throughout the season. Will Palmer was the winner of the Cup, starting 10 of the 24 races from pole position.

2015 BRDC Formula 4 Autumn Trophy

References

External links
 

BRDC British Formula 3 Championship seasons
BRDC Formula 4
BRDC Formula 4